Self-portraits in the Uffizi Gallery number over 1,600 and have been collected over the centuries by various owners of the Uffizi. Only a few were ever on show at one time. From 1866 a selection was on show in the Vasari Corridor, but this became too unsafe for the growing stream of visitors in the 1930s and after World War II it was never reopened. The Uffizi has made exhibitions of selections of self-portraits, including a traveling exhibition of self-portraits by women in 2011.

References

Uffizi